Girella is a genus of sea chubs mostly native to the Pacific Ocean with a smaller presence in the Atlantic oceans.

Species
There are currently 18 recognized species in this genus:
 Girella albostriata Steindachner, 1898
 Girella cyanea W. J. Macleay, 1881 (Blue drummer)
 Girella elevata W. J. Macleay, 1881 (Black drummer, rock blackfish)
 Girella feliciana H. W. Clark, 1938
 Girella fimbriata (McCulloch, 1920) (Caramel drummer)
 Girella freminvillii (Valenciennes, 1846)
 Girella laevifrons (Tschudi, 1846)
 Girella leonina (J. Richardson, 1846) (Kuromejina)
 Girella mezina D. S. Jordan & Starks, 1907 (Okinamejina)
 Girella nebulosa Kendall & Radcliffe, 1912 (Rapanui nibbler)
 Girella nigricans (Ayres, 1860) (Opaleye)
 Girella punctata J. E. Gray, 1835 (Mejina) (Blackeye seabream)
 Girella simplicidens R. C. Osburn & Nichols, 1916 (Gulf opal eye)
 Girella stuebeli Troschel, 1866
 Girella tephraeops (J. Richardson, 1846) (Rock blackfish)
 Girella tricuspidata (Quoy & Gaimard, 1824) (Parore, luderick)
 Girella zebra (J. Richardson, 1846) (Zebra fish)
 Girella zonata Günther, 1859

Synonyms
The following list of genus names have all been synonymized with Girella:

 Aplodon Thominot, 1883
 Camarina Ayres, 1860
 Doidyxodon Valenciennes, 1846
 Girellichthys Klunzinger, 1872
 Girellipiscis Whitley, 1931
 Girellops Regan, 1913
 Incisidens T. N. Gill, 1862
 Iredalella Whitley, 1931
 Melambaphes Günther, 1863
 Melanychthys Temminck & Schlegel, 1844
 Neotephraeops Castelnau, 1872
 Tephraeops Günther, 1859

Gallery

References

 
Kyphosidae
Taxa named by John Edward Gray
Marine fish genera
Ray-finned fish genera